Chris Eyre  (born 1968), an enrolled member of the Cheyenne and Arapaho Tribes, is an American film director and producer who as of 2012 is chairman of the film department at the Santa Fe University of Art and Design.

Films
In 1998, Chris Eyre worked on two film projects. His first release was Things We Do (1998). His debut film, Smoke Signals (1998), won the Sundance Film Festival Filmmakers Trophy and the Audience Award. It also won "Best Film" honors at the 1998 American Indian Film Festival.

Eyre's second film, Skins, is the story of two brothers on the Pine Ridge Reservation, a  tribal cop and a Vietnam vet battling alcohol and emotional problems. He said at a screening: "The only thing you get in making period pieces about Indians is guilt. I'm interested in doing what non-Indian filmmakers can't do, which is portray contemporary Indians."

Eyre has also directed two episodes of the famed PBS series Mystery!; A Thief of Time and Skinwalkers starring Adam Beach as Jim Chee, and Wes Studi as Joe Leaphorn. Both were executive produced by Robert Redford and based on the best selling Tony Hillerman novels. Skinwalkers is a mystery involving skinwalkers or shape-shifters, and the murders of several medicine men. A Thief of Time is a who-dunnit that intertwines very competitive anthropologists, possible artifact thievery, a missing professor, and the legend of the Anasazi.

Eyre's Edge of America was the 2004 Sundance Film Festival "opening night" film. Edge of America is loosely based on the true story of a black English teacher who goes to the Three Nations Reservation to teach, but ends up coaching the very underachieving girls basketball team and takes them all the way to the state finals. In the process, he learns as much about their culture and race relations in America as they learn about winning and self-esteem. On January 29, 2006, Eyre won the Directors Guild of America's award for Outstanding Directorial Achievement in Children's Programs for Edge of America, becoming the first Native American to win the award.

Eyre's short film, A Thousand Roads, the "signature film" for the Smithsonian's National Museum of the American Indian, opened in Washington, D.C. on April 10, 2005, for an unlimited and exclusive engagement. It is a contemporary film, following four American Indians in different locations, as they each confront everyday events.

Chris Eyre was named a 2007 USA Rockefeller Foundation Fellow and awarded a $50,000 grant by United States Artists, a public charity that supports and promotes the work of American artists.

In 2008 Eyre directed the first three episodes of We Shall Remain, a mini-series that establishes Native history as an essential part of American history from PBS's acclaimed history series American Experience.

Eyre directed the film Hide Away, which was released in 2011. The film's cast includes Josh Lucas and Ayelet Zurer.

Chris Eyre was appointed as chairman of the film department at the Santa Fe University of Art and Design as of January 2012.

In 2017, Eyre is reported to be working on a documentary on "racism in New Mexico", with his starting point being the monument to Juan de Oñate in Alcalde, New Mexico, whose foot was cut off in 1997.

Filmography

References

External links
 
 
 
 Mystery! American at pbs.org
 We Shall Remain
 Rockefeller Foundation 2007 Fellows
 United States Artists Arts Advocacy Organization

1968 births
American film directors
American television directors
American television producers
Cheyenne and Arapaho Tribes people
Living people
Native American filmmakers
Artists from Portland, Oregon
Directors Guild of America Award winners
College of Santa Fe faculty
Film producers from Oregon